Huai Rat railway station is a railway station located in Huai Racha Subdistrict, Huai Rat District, Buriram Province.

References 

Railway stations in Thailand
Buriram province